List of Murals by Luc Tuymans is a list of mural paintings and other murals by the Belgian artist Luc Tuymans (born June 14, 1958). Tuymans is best known for his paintings which explore our relationship with history and confront our seeming ability to ignore it. World War II is a recurring theme in his work. He is a key figure of the generation of European figurative painters who gained renown at a time when many believed the medium had lost its relevance due to the new digital age. Much of Tuymans’ work deals with moral complexity, specifically the coexistence of ‘good’ and ‘evil’. His subjects range from major historical events such as the Holocaust to the seemingly inconsequential or banal: wallpaper, Christmas decorations or everyday objects for example.

Tuymans has made about fifty site-specific murals since the mid-1990s, five permanent and the rest temporarily created for exhibitions. The type of mural techniques used is either acrylic paint or fresco mural applied directly on the existing wall surfaces. On rare occasions, he also made fabric murals, which are based on drawings that are scanned and mechanically produced.

The listing is ordered by type of mural and then by year. Most of the references come from the comprehensive catalogue raisonné edited by German art historian Eva Meyer-Hermann and published by the David Zwirner Gallery and Yale University Press (2018–2019).

Permanent mural paintings

Temporary mural paintings

Textile murals

See also

List of Belgian painters
New European Painting

References

External links
  
 "Luc Tuymans", The Museum of Modern Art
 "Luc Tuymans",  Tate Modern
 "Luc Tuymans", Zeno X Gallery 
 "Luc Tuymans", David Zwirner Gallery

Lists of paintings
Murals